Urbain is a name of French origin which may refer to:

Family name
 Achille Urbain (1884–1957), French biologist
 Georges Urbain (1872–1938), French chemist
 Ismael Urbain (1812–1884), French journalist and interpreter
 Jacques Urbain, Belgian scientist
 Jean-Didier Urbain (born 1951), French sociologist
 Walter M. Urbain (1910–2002), American food scientist

Given name
 Urbain Audibert (1789–1846), French nurseryman
 Urbain Boiret (1731–1774), Canadian priest
 Urbain Bouriant (1849–1903), French egyptologist
 Urbain Braems (born 1933), Belgian soccer player
 Urbain Cancelier (fl. 1988–2012), French comedian and actor
 Urbain de Maillé-Brézé (1597–1650), French military officer and diplomat
 Urbain Dubois (1818–1901), French chef
 Urbain Gohier (1862–1951), French lawyer and journalist
 Urbain Grandier (1590–1634), French priest
 Urbain Johnson (1824 –1917), farmer and politician
 Urbain de Florit de La Tour de Clamouze (1794–1868), French lay brother
 Urbain Le Verrier (1811–1877), French mathematician
 Urbain Lippé (1831–1896), Canadian notary and politician
 Urbain Mbenga, Guinean and Congolese religious leader
 Urbain Olivier (1810–1888), Swiss writer
Urbain Ozanne (1835–1903), French-born American political activist, sheriff, businessman 

Other
 Métal Urbain, French punk music group
 Urbain Cote Round Barn, ND, USA

See also
 Saint-Urbain (disambiguation)
 Urban (name)